Team events for squash at the 2019 Southeast Asian Games were held in Manila Polo Club, Makati, Philippines from 4 to 9 December 2019.

Schedule
All times are Philippine Standard Time (UTC+8).

Results

Men's team

Women's team

Mixed team

References

Team